Lady Whirlwind a.k.a. Deep Thrust is a 1972 Hong Kong martial arts film written and directed by Huang Feng, starring Angela Mao.

Plot
A young man Ling Shih-hua (Chang Yi) is severely beaten by Japanese mobsters and left for dead on the beach. He is nursed back to health by a pretty young girl, and he vows to take revenge on the criminals. Meanwhile, Miss Tien Li-Chun (Angela Mao) comes to town with a score to settle with Ling. Apparently, her sister was jilted by Ling and she killed herself, so Tien must avenge her by taking his life. Ling begs her to spare him until after he gets his revenge, to which she reluctantly agrees. When he gets mercilessly beaten by his enemies, Tien saves him as she cannot allow him to die by someone else's hand. As Tien waits for Ling Shih-hua to recover so she can beat him, he runs into an old man who teaches him the art of t'ai chi. This gives him the edge he needs, and he finally kills the leader of the gang. Angela jumps in to take her revenge, but Ling's girlfriend throws herself between them and begs for mercy. Tien spares his life.

Cast
 Chang Yu - Ling Shi-hua
 Angela Mao – Miss Tien Li-Chun
 Pai Ying - Tung Ku
 Oh Kyung-Ah - Hsuang Hsuang
 Liu Ah-Na - Tiao Ta Niang
 Chin Yuet-Sang - Wen Tien
 Sammo Hung - Tiao Ta Niang's brother
 Kim Nam-il - Tang Sek Ping
 Yeung Wai - Thug
 Wong Fung - Casino dealer
 Law Kei - Thug
 Martin Chui Man-Kwai - Thug
 Cham Siu-Hung	- Thug
 Bruce Leung Siu-Lung - Thug
 Wong Chi-Ming - Thug
 Ang Saan - Thug
 Jang Jeong-Kuk - Thug
 Wilson Tong - Thug
 Chui Hing-Chun - Thug
 Yeung Wah - Thug
 Tong Kam-Tong	Thug

Box office
The film grossed HK$401,794 in Hong Kong. Overseas in the United States and Europe, the film grossed millions of US dollars. This adds up to at least more than  grossed in Hong Kong and Western territories.

References

External links
 
 
 Lady Whirlwind at hkmdb.com
 Lady Whirlwind at filmaffinity.com

Kung fu films
Hong Kong martial arts films
1972 films
1970s Cantonese-language films
Second Sino-Japanese War films
1972 martial arts films
1970s Hong Kong films